= Pimp My Search =

Novelty website to create a Google lookalike webpage

Pimp My Search was a novelty website to create a Google lookalike webpage, replacing the word "Google" with a word or phrase of the user's choice. Pimp My Search was started in 2006, but became popular only in 2008 after featured in many media websites and YouTube videos. The site was closed down later in 2009, citing a dispute over 'trademark issues'.

== Controversies with Google ==
In February 2009, Pimp my Search ended Google search facilities and posted a message that read: "Because of Trademark issues Google is no longer allowing searches from us...". The site has remained closed, for some time (beginning in 2009) displaying the message "Because of Trademark issues Pimp my Search is closed for ever" and linking to another website (ShinySearch.com).
